Róbert Krajči (born 2 February 1981 in Dubnica) is a Slovak professional ice hockey player currently playing for HK Dubnica of the Slovak 1. Liga

Krajči previously played in the Slovak Extraliga for MsHK Žilina, the Czech Extraliga for Motor České Budějovice and HC Slovan Ústečtí Lvi and the Kazakhstan Hockey Championship for Arystan Temirtau, and Beibarys Atyrau.

References

External links

Arystan Temirtau players
1981 births
Living people
Beibarys Atyrau players
HC 07 Detva players
HK Dubnica players
Motor České Budějovice players
KH Sanok players
Slovak ice hockey forwards
HC Slovan Ústečtí Lvi players
TH Unia Oświęcim players
MsHK Žilina players
People from Dubnica nad Váhom
Sportspeople from the Trenčín Region
Slovak expatriate ice hockey players in the Czech Republic
Slovak expatriate sportspeople in Kazakhstan
Slovak expatriate sportspeople in Poland
Slovak expatriate sportspeople in Romania
Expatriate ice hockey players in Romania
Expatriate ice hockey players in Kazakhstan
Expatriate ice hockey players in Poland